Shamsgarh is a village in the Bhopal district of Madhya Pradesh, India. It is located in the Huzur tehsil and the Phanda block.

The village is home to a Shiva temple and a Jain temple. The Shiva temple and two step wells were declared as state-protected monuments in 2012. The idols in this temple have been dated to 11th century.

Demographics 

According to the 2011 census of India, Samasgarh has 72 households. The effective literacy rate (i.e. the literacy rate of population excluding children aged 6 and below) is 64.56%.

References 

Villages in Huzur tehsil